The Little Brothers of the Gospel (abbreviated PFE) are a male Catholic religious congregation of diocesan right. The movement was founded in 1956 by René Voillaume, the first superior general of the Little Brothers of Jesus, to evangelise to the poor. It is one of a group of communities founded on inspiration of Charles de Foucauld.

, the prior of the Little Brothers of the Gospel is Andreas Knapp.

History

Background 
René Voillaume was a priest and one of the founding members of the Little Brothers of Jesus, which was formed in 1933, inspired by the writings of Charles de Foucauld. They first established themselves in the Saharan oasis of El Abiodh Sidi Cheik.  The Little Brothers of Jesus first lived a monastic form of life, but after World War II began to set up small "fraternities" in working-class neighbourhoods. As such, Voillaume decided to create a new congregation, branched off from the Little Brothers of Jesus, with a special focus on evangelising to the poor.

Formation 
In 18 July 1956, at the orders of Voillaume, the first fraternity of the Little Brothers of the Gospel was formed in Camargue, France consisting of three brothers. From 1956 to 1960, another four foundations were created in Cần Thơ, South Vietnam (1956), Bindua, Italy (1957), Jaffna, Sri Lanka (1959), and Portin Almos, Argentina (1960). The congregation was subsequently legally recognised as a religious congregation of the Little Brothers of the Gospel on 13 June 1968 by the bishop of Aix-en-Provence.

In 1973, the brothers formed a central fraternity for the congregation in Cépie, France. This was later moved to Brussels, Belgium in 1981. The constitutions of the congregation were later revised and received approbation by Cardinal Danneels, bishop of Mechelen-Brussels, on 5 January 1986.

Activities 
Among the declared three pillars of the congregation are:
 Prayer;
 Fraternity love;
 Sharing the life of the poor.

Through these three pillars of their life, the Little Brothers of the Gospel wants to spread the Good News of Jesus.

They are present in Europe (France, Italy, Germany, Spain, etc.), Central and South America (Mexico, Venezuela, Bolivia, etc.), and Africa (Kenya, Tanzania). Their Central Fraternity is in Brussels, Belgium. As of 2008, there were seventy-one members worldwide.

On the night of 29 to 30 July 2002, Yves Lescanne, Little Brother of the Gospel, was killed in Maroua, Cameroon. French, brother Yves Lescanne was born March 20, 1940 in Gironde. He took care of the abandoned children in Maroua through a small organization: "la belle étoile".

Notable members 
Carlo Carretto, author and activist
Philippe Stevens, Bishop of Maroua-Mokolo (Cameroon) from 1994 to 2014

References

External links 

 Official website (in French)

Christian organizations established in 1956
Gospel
Catholic religious institutes established in the 20th century